"A Dónde Vamos a Parar" is the first single of the album En Total Plenitud (2010). The song was written and performed by Mexican singer-songwriter Marco Antonio Solís. The song was nominated a Latin Grammy Award for Song of the Year in the Latin Grammy Awards of 2011.

Chart performance

See also
List of number-one songs of 2010 (Mexico)

References 

2010 singles
2010 songs
Monitor Latino Top General number-one singles
Songs written by Marco Antonio Solís
Marco Antonio Solís songs
Fonovisa Records singles
2010s ballads
Pop ballads